Cape Allen is a bare rock point located 3 nautical miles (6 km) southwest of Mount Hope, near the mouth of Beardmore Glacier. The point forms the west side of the south approach to The Gateway. Discovered by the British Antarctic Expedition (1907–09) and named for Robert Allen of the Franklin Relief Expedition to the Arctic.

Headlands of the Ross Dependency
Shackleton Coast